Robert Frederick Chelsea Moore  (12 April 1941 – 24 February 1993) was an English professional footballer. He most notably played for West Ham United, captaining the club for more than ten years, and was the captain of the England national team that won the 1966 FIFA World Cup. He is widely regarded as one of the greatest defenders in the history of football, and was cited by Pelé as the greatest defender that he had ever played against.

Widely regarded as West Ham's greatest ever player, Moore played over 600 games for the club during a 16-year tenure, winning the FA Cup in 1963–64 and the UEFA Cup Winners' Cup in 1964–65. During his time at the club, he won the FWA Footballer of the Year in 1964 and the West Ham Player of the Year in 1961, 1963, 1968 and 1970. In August 2008, West Ham United officially retired his number 6 shirt, 15 years after his death.

Moore was made captain of England in 1964, at age 23, going on to lift the World Cup trophy in 1966. He won a total of 108 caps for his country, which at the time of his international retirement in 1973 was a national record. This record was later broken by Peter Shilton. Moore's total of 108 caps continued as a record for an outfield player until 28 March 2009, when David Beckham gained his 109th cap. Moore is a member of the World Team of the 20th Century. A national team icon, a bronze statue of Moore stands at the entrance to Wembley Stadium.

A composed central defender, Moore was best known for his reading of the game and ability to anticipate opposition movements, thereby distancing himself from the image of the hard-tackling, high-jumping defender. Receiving the BBC Sports Personality of the Year in 1966, he was the first footballer to win the award and he remained the only one for a further 24 years. Moore was given an OBE in the New Year Honours List. He was made an inaugural inductee of the English Football Hall of Fame in 2002 in recognition of his impact on the English game as a player and in the same year he was named in the BBC's list of the 100 Greatest Britons.

Football career

Early days

Moore was born in Upney Hospital on Saturday, 12 April 1941 in Barking, Essex, son of Robert E. Moore and Doris (née Buckle). He attended Westbury Primary School Barking then Tom Hood School, Leytonstone, playing football for both.

In 1956, Moore joined West Ham United as a player and, after advancing through their youth set-up, he played his first game on 8 September 1958 against Manchester United. In putting on the number six shirt, he replaced his mentor Malcolm Allison, who was suffering from tuberculosis.

At international level, Moore played for the England national youth team. The team reached the UEFA Youth Tournament final in 1958, The team did win the British Amateur Youth Championship that year.

Alongside Geoff Hurst, both played in the 1959 FA Youth Cup final team that lost to Blackburn Rovers (1–2 on aggregate), but both were also in the team that won the Southern Junior Floodlit Cup (1–0 v Chelsea) later that year. Moore also played cricket for the Essex youth team alongside Hurst.

Malcolm Allison never played another first team game for West Ham as Moore became a regular. A composed central defender, Moore was admired for his reading of the game and ability to anticipate opposition movements, thereby distancing himself from the image of the hard-tackling, high-jumping defender. Moore's ability to head the ball or keep up with the pace was average at best, but the way he read the game, marshalled his team and timed his tackles marked him out as world class. Moore was sent off once over the course of his West Ham career, for a foul on Dave Wagstaffe in the final moment of a match against Manchester City in November 1961. The referee had simultaneously blown his whistle for the offence and for full-time. As red cards were not issued at that time, the dismissal did not become apparent until after the match.

An England star, a European winner
In 1960, Moore earned a call up to the England Under-23 squad. His form and impact on West Ham as a whole earned him a late call-up to the full England squad by Walter Winterbottom and The Football Association selection committee in 1962, when final preparations were being made for the summer's World Cup finals in Chile. Moore was uncapped as he flew to South America with the rest of the squad, but made his début on 20 May 1962 in England's final pre-tournament friendly – a 4–0 win over Peru in Lima. Also débuting that day was Tottenham Hotspur defender Maurice Norman. Both proved so impressive that they stayed in the team for the whole of England's participation in the World Cup, which ended in defeat by eventual winners Brazil in the quarter finals at Viña del Mar.

On 29 May 1963, 22-year-old Moore captained his country for the first time in just his 12th appearance after the retirement of Johnny Haynes and an injury to his successor, Jimmy Armfield. He was the youngest man ever to captain England at the highest level. England defeated Czechoslovakia 4–2 in the game and Armfield returned to the role of captain afterwards, but new coach Alf Ramsey gave Moore the job permanently during a series of summer friendlies in 1964, organised because England had failed to reach the latter stages of the European Championships.

1964 turned out to be quite an eventful year for Moore. As well as gaining the England captaincy, he lifted the FA Cup as West Ham defeated Preston North End 3–2 in the final at Wembley, courtesy of a last-minute goal from Ronnie Boyce. On a personal level, Moore was also successfully treated for testicular cancer and was named the Football Writers' Association Footballer of the Year.

The FA Cup success would become the first of three successful Wembley finals in as many years for Moore. In 1965, he lifted the European Cup Winners Cup after West Ham defeated 1860 Munich 2–0 in the final with both goals coming from Alan Sealey. By now he was the first choice captain for England with 30 caps, and around whom Ramsey was building a team to prove correct his prediction that they would win the 1966 World Cup.

1966 had a mixed start for Moore. In January, he scored his first England goal in a 1–1 draw with Poland at Goodison Park, but two months later captained West Ham to the final of the League Cup – in its last season before its transfer to Wembley as a one-off final – which they lost 5–3 on aggregate to West Bromwich Albion. For Moore, who had scored in the first leg, and his West Ham teammates Geoff Hurst and Martin Peters, considerable consolation lay ahead. Moore scored his second and ultimately final England goal in a friendly against Norway, two weeks before the World Cup would begin.

1966 World Cup

On the verge of his greatest triumph, details were released to the press in early 1966 that Moore wanted to leave West Ham. Moore had let his contract slip to termination, and only after the intervention of Sir Alf Ramsey and realisation he was technically ineligible to play, did he re-sign with West Ham to allow him to captain the England team of 1966. Ramsey had summoned West Ham manager Ron Greenwood to England's hotel and told the two of them to resolve their differences and get a contract signed up. Moore was the leader of the World Cup winning side and established himself as a world-class player and sporting icon. With all their games at Wembley, England had got through their group with little trouble, they then beat Argentina in their quarter final and a Eusébio-led Portugal team in the semi-finals. West Germany awaited in the final.

According to Geoff Hurst's autobiography, England full back George Cohen overheard Ramsey talking to his coaching staff about the possibility of dropping Moore for the final and deploying the more battle-hardened Norman Hunter in his place. However, eventually they settled on keeping the captain in the team. Moore had not been playing badly, nor had he given the impression that he had been distracted by his contract dispute prior to the competition. The only possible explanations were that the Germans had some rather fast attacking players, which could expose Moore's own lack of pace, and that Hunter – who was of a similar age to Moore but only had four caps – was the club partner of Moore's co-defender with England, Jack Charlton.

In the final, England went 1–0 down through Helmut Haller, but Moore's awareness and quick-thinking helped England to a swift equaliser. He was fouled by Wolfgang Overath midway inside the German half and, rather than remonstrate or head back into defence, he picked himself up quickly while looking ahead and delivered an instant free kick on to Hurst's head, in a movement practised at West Ham. Hurst scored.

The West Ham connection to England's biggest day became stronger when Peters scored to take England 2–1 up, but the Germans equalised in the final minute of normal time through Wolfgang Weber – as Moore appealed unsuccessfully for a handball decision – to take the match into extra time.

Ramsey was convinced the Germans were exhausted, and after Hurst scored a controversial and heavily debated goal, the game looked over. With seconds remaining, and England under the pressure of another German attack, the ball broke to Moore on the edge of his own penalty area. Teammates shouted at Moore to just get rid of the ball, but he calmly picked out the feet of Hurst 40 yards (36 m) upfield, who scored to bring the score to 4–2.

Of many memorable images from that day, one is of Moore wiping his hands clean of mud and sweat on the velvet tablecloth before shaking the hand of Queen Elizabeth II as she presented him with the Jules Rimet trophy (World Cup). The Guardian wrote "Moore is the calmest person in the stadium as he leads the England players up to the Royal Box".

As an icon

Moore became a national icon as a consequence of England's success, with he and the other two West Ham players taking the World Cup around the grounds which West Ham visited during the following domestic season. He was awarded the coveted BBC Sports Personality of the Year title at the end of 1966, the first footballer to do so, and remaining the only one for a further 24 years. He was also given an OBE in the New Year Honours List.

Moore's image and popularity allowed him to start a number of business ventures, including a sports shop next to West Ham's ground, Upton Park, and he also appeared with his wife Tina, along with Peters and his wife Kathy, in a television advertisement for the pub industry, urging people to "Look in at the local".

He continued to play for West Ham and England, earning his 50th cap in a 5–1 win over Wales at the end of 1966 in a Home International match which also doubled up as a qualifier for the 1968 European Championships. England ultimately reached the semi-finals (the tournament was just a four-team event) where they played Yugoslavia in Florence and lost 1–0. England, as champions, did not have to qualify for the next World Cup, and Moore remained the first name on Ramsey's team sheet, winning his 78th cap prior to the squad's flight to South America for a short period of altitude-acclimatisation, before going on to the finals in Mexico.

1970

The year 1970 was a bittersweet, mixed and eventful one for Moore. Retained as captain for the 1970 World Cup, there was however heavy disruption to preparations when an attempt was made to implicate Moore in the theft of a bracelet from a jeweller in Bogotá, Colombia, where England were involved in a warm-up game. A young assistant had claimed that Moore had removed the bracelet from the hotel shop without paying for it. While Moore had been in the shop (having entered with Bobby Charlton to look for a gift for Charlton's wife, Norma), no proof was offered to support the accusations. Moore was arrested and then released. He then travelled with the England team to play another match against Ecuador in Quito. He played, winning his 80th cap, and England were 2–0 victors, but when the team plane stopped back in Colombia on the return to Mexico, Moore was detained and placed under four days of house arrest. Diplomatic pressure, plus the obvious weakness of the evidence, eventually saw the case dropped entirely, and an exonerated Moore returned to Mexico to rejoin the squad and prepare for the World Cup. He received a guard of honour from his squad when he arrived at the team hotel.

Moore went on to play a leading role in England's progress through their group. On 2 June he captained England to a 1–0 victory against Romania. In the second game against favourites Brazil, there was a defining moment for Moore when he tackled Jairzinho with such precision and cleanness that it has been described as the perfect tackle. It continues to be shown on television around the world. Brazil still won the game 1–0, but England progressed through the group. Moore swapped shirts with Pelé after the game. The shirt was displayed at the National Football Museum in Manchester, courtesy of the Priory Collection. A 1–0 win over Czechoslovakia allowed England to finish second in the group and advance to the knockout stage.

At the Quarter Final stage, a rematch of the 1966 World Cup against West Germany, England took a 2–0 lead but lost 3–2 in extra time. At the end of the year, Moore was voted runner-up (behind Gerd Müller of West Germany) for the 1970 European Footballer of the Year award.

Final years at the top

On 10 August 1970, Moore received an anonymous threat to kidnap his wife and hold her to a £10,000 ransom. This caused him to pull out of pre-season friendlies against Bristol City and Bournemouth. However, his services to West Ham were rewarded with a testimonial match against Celtic at the end of 1970.

Although Moore was seen as an icon and a perfect influence on the game, he was not without his faults or controversies. On 7 January 1971, he and three West Ham teammates, Jimmy Greaves, Brian Dear and Clyde Best, were all fined by West Ham manager Greenwood after going out drinking in a nightclub until the early hours of the morning prior to an FA Cup third round tie against Blackpool. The nightclub in Blackpool was owned by Moore's friend, boxer Brian London. West Ham lost the tie 4–0. They were all fined a week's wages. Blackpool were the bottom of Division one at the time, and were relegated at the end of the season. Coincidentally, Moore was featured on TV as the subject on This Is Your Life the night before. Brian Glanville stated that it was not uncommon for Moore to drink heavily, but he was often seen training with West Ham the next day, working off the alcohol he had consumed the night before. On 12 June 1972, he also played for the Greek side Olympiacos, as their captain, in a friendly match against the Brazilian club Corinthians.

Moore surpassed West Ham's appearances record in 1973 when he played for the club for the 509th time. Three days earlier, on Valentine's Day 1973, he won his 100th cap for England in a comprehensive 5–0 win over Scotland at Hampden Park By this stage, only Peters and Alan Ball from the 1966 squad were also still involved with the England team. Later the same year, Moore was exposed defensively by Poland in a qualifier for the 1974 World Cup in Chorzów, deflecting a free kick past goalkeeper Peter Shilton to put the home side ahead, and then losing possession to Wlodzimierz Lubanski, who scored the second.

Moore's form had dipped enough for Ramsey to choose not to select him for the return game at Wembley which England had to win to qualify. Any other result would send Poland through. Being replaced by Norman Hunter in defence and Peters as the skipper for that match, Moore is understood to have asked Ramsey if this meant he was no longer required, to which Ramsey replied: "Of course not. I need you as my captain at the World Cup next year." It never happened, as England could only draw 1–1. During the Wembley match, Hunter attempted to make a tackle but instead trod on the ball and lost it, a similar error to Moore's lost possession in Chorzów, which allowed Poland to quickly counterattack and score thanks to Shilton's mistake. Allan Clarke equalised with a penalty, but England could not score again as goalkeeper Jan Tomaszewski blocked numerous English chances. Moore later told how he sat alongside Ramsey on the bench and kept urging him to make a substitution, but Ramsey was hesitant to do so. When Kevin Hector finally did come on for Martin Chivers after 85 minutes Moore could be seen on TV yanking down Hector's tracksuit bottoms while Ramsey sat immobile. Moore, later, said to David Miller "you could 'feel' the minutes escaping. I said to Alf, we need someone to go through the middle. He just nodded. We couldn't get Kevin out there quick enough. We almost threw him onto the pitch." Hunter was in an inconsolable state as he was led off the pitch by Harold Shepherdson, and by Moore, whose place in the side he had taken. England's failure to qualify for the 1974 FIFA World Cup signalled the end of Ramsey's reign as national team manager when he was sacked six months later.

Moore won his 108th and final cap in the next game, a 1–0 friendly defeat to Italy on 14 November 1973. He became England's most capped player, beating Bobby Charlton's record by two appearances, and equalled Billy Wright's record of 90 appearances as captain. Peter Shilton, David Beckham and Steven Gerrard have since overtaken the caps record, but the joint captaincy record remains.

After West Ham and England

Moore played his last game for West Ham in an FA Cup tie against Hereford United in January 1974. He was injured in the match. On 14 March the same year, he left West Ham after more than 15 years, taking with him the club record for appearances (since overtaken by Billy Bonds) and the most international caps for an outfield player.

He joined London rivals Fulham, who were in the Second Division, for £25,000. During Moore's first season there they defeated West Ham in a League Cup tie and then reached the FA Cup Final where they faced West Ham again. This time Fulham lost the game, 2–0, and Moore made his final appearance at Wembley as a professional player.

Moore played his final professional game in England for Fulham on 14 May 1977 against Blackburn Rovers. He played for two teams in the North American Soccer League – San Antonio Thunder in 1976 (24 games, 1 goal) and Seattle Sounders in 1978 (7 games). During 1976, there was also a final appearance on the international field for Team USA in games against Italy, Brazil and an England team captained by Gerry Francis. This was the U.S.A. Bicentennial Cup Tournament, which capitalised on NASL and more importantly England and Italy both failing to qualify for the European Championships that year.

In April 1978, he signed as a professional player with Danish side Herning Fremad to promote Danish football's new transition to professional football, playing 9 games for the club before he retired. In May 1978, he signed with Canadian side Edmonton Black Gold for a summer exhibition schedule, although he only joined the team six weeks later ahead of the June 23 match against Benfica. After Moore's second game with Edmonton against the Seattle Sounders on June 28, he was signed by the Sounders on July 7.

The following year, Moore played for Highgate-based club Cracovia for a tour of Malaysia. In 1983, Moore appeared in 8 games for the now-defunct Carolina Lightnin', after injuries left the club without cover.

Post-football career
Moore retired from playing professionally in 1978, and had a short relatively unsuccessful spell in football management at Eastern AA in Hong Kong, Oxford City and Southend United.

He became manager of Southend United in 1984. In his first full season, 1984–85, Southend narrowly avoided having to apply for re-election to the Football League amid severe financial difficulties. However, the side was gradually rebuilt and in the 1985–86 season Southend started well and were in the promotion race until the new year before eventually finishing 9th. His successor, David Webb built upon those foundations to win promotion the following year. Moore agreed to serve on the board of the club and held this role until his death. Moore joined London radio station Capital Gold as a football analyst and commentator in 1990.

His life after football was eventful and difficult, with poor business dealings and his marriage ending. Moore's supporters said that the Football Association could have given a role to him, as the only Englishman to captain a FIFA World Cup winning team or given him an ambassadorial role.

Drink-driving

Moore was fined £150 and banned from driving for 12 months for drink-driving on 12 April 1977, his 36th birthday at Stratford. On 15 December 1983 he was arrested in Biggleswade, Bedfordshire and banned from driving for three years and fined £175 for drink-driving on 11 January 1984.

Illness and death

Moore's first cancer was in 1964, two years before England's first World Cup win — a diagnosis of testicular cancer, treated by orchidectomy of one; it had not spread. In April 1991, Moore underwent an operation for suspected colorectal cancer. At the time it was reported as an "emergency stomach operation".

On 14 February 1993, he announced he was suffering from colorectal cancer and liver cancer; by this time it had spread. Three days later he commentated on an England match against San Marino at Wembley, alongside his friend Jonathan Pearce. Moore attended a dinner after the match and made a presentation. That was to be his final public act; seven days later on 24 February, at 6:36 am, he died at the age of 51.

He was the first member of the England World Cup winning side to die, the next being Alan Ball 14 years later. Moore was outlived by the squad's trainer, Harold Shepherdson, who died in September 1995, and manager, Alf Ramsey, who died in April 1999, John Connelly in October 2012, Ron Springett in September 2015, Gerry Byrne in November 2015, Jimmy Armfield in January 2018, Ray Wilson in May 2018, Gordon Banks in February 2019, Martin Peters in December 2019, Peter Bonetti and Norman Hunter in April 2020, Jack Charlton in July 2020, Nobby Stiles in October 2020, Jimmy Greaves in September 2021, Ron Flowers in November 2021 and George Cohen in December 2022. Moore's funeral was held on 2 March 1993 at Putney Vale crematorium and his ashes kept in the plot of his father, Robert Edward (died 1978) and his mother, Doris Joyce (died 1992) at City of London Cemetery and Crematorium.

The first West Ham home game after his death was on 6 March 1993, against Wolverhampton Wanderers. The Boleyn Ground was awash with floral tributes, scarves and other football memorabilia from West Ham fans and those of other clubs. Fellow 1966 World Cup winners Geoff Hurst and Martin Peters placed a floral replica of a West Ham shirt, showing Moore's number, 6, on the back, on the centre spot before the game. West Ham rested the No. 6 for the game, with the regular No. 6, Ian Bishop, wearing No. 12. The game was won by West Ham 3–1: Trevor Morley, Julian Dicks and Matty Holmes as to the trio, Steve Bull as to the reply.

His former England teammate, Jack Charlton, on a BBC documentary of Moore's life in and outside of football, said of Moore's death:

On 28 June 1993, a public service was held in Westminster Abbey, attended by all the other members of the 1966 World Cup team. He was only the second sportsman to be so honoured, the first being West Indies cricketer Sir Frank Worrell.

Legacy

The Bobby Moore Fund is a charity in the United Kingdom, formed in 1993 by Stephanie Moore, and Cancer Research UK (CRUK) in memory of her late husband to raise money for research into bowel cancer and also public awareness of the disease. A campaign, Make Bobby Proud was initiated in 2013 to fundraise. As of February 2013 the Bobby Moore Fund had raised £18.8m towards bowel cancer research.

In 1996, comedians Frank Skinner and David Baddiel used the line "But I still see that tackle by Moore" in the lyrics to their song "Three Lions", which was the England team's official song at the 1996 European Championships, which was adopted by fans rather than the tournament's official song "We're In This Together" by Simply Red. It referred to the famous incident with Jairzinho in 1970, and was re-created by Baddiel, Skinner and England left back Stuart Pearce for the video. It was written in the context of a list of great England moments of the past as proof that England could win a tournament again.

Moore was made an inaugural inductee of the English Football Hall of Fame in 2002 in recognition of his impact on the English game as a player. The same year he was named in the BBC's list of the 100 Greatest Britons. In November 2003, to celebrate UEFA's Jubilee, he was selected as the Golden Player of England by The Football Association as their most outstanding player of the past 50 years.

On 28 April 2003, Prince Andrew as president of The Football Association unveiled the World Cup Sculpture (also called The Champions) in a prominent place near the Boleyn Ground, at the junction of Barking Road and Green Street. It depicts Moore holding the Jules Rimet Trophy aloft, on the shoulders of Geoff Hurst and Ray Wilson, together with Martin Peters. The one and a half-size bronze was sculpted by Philip Jackson after a famous photograph taken just after the 1966 final at the old Wembley. The south bank at West Ham's ground up until 2016, the Boleyn Ground in Upton Park, was named the Bobby Moore Stand shortly after Moore's death. When West Ham moved to the London Stadium in 2016, a stand at the north end of the stadium was redesignated as the Bobby Moore Stand, and was officially opened as such before a pre-season friendly match against Italian side Juventus. The Moore family was represented at the official opening ceremony by Moore's grandson, Frederick Moore-Hobbis.

On Friday 11 May 2007, a statue of Bobby Moore was unveiled by Sir Bobby Charlton outside the entrance of the newly reconstructed Wembley Stadium as the "finishing touch" to the project, with the stadium officially opening on Saturday 19 May with the staging of the 2007 FA Cup Final. The twice life-size bronze statue, also sculpted by Jackson, depicts Moore looking down Wembley Way.

In August 2008 West Ham United officially retired the number 6 shirt as a mark of respect, 15 years after his death.
On 26 July 2016, Moore became the first footballer to be honoured with an English Heritage Blue Plaque outside his home. The plaque was unveiled on a brick wall at Moore's childhood home in Waverley Gardens, Barking in a ceremony attended by his daughter, Roberta.
In April 2017 airline Norwegian announced Moore's image would appear on the tail fin one of their Boeing 737-800 aircraft. Moore is one of the company's six "British tail fin heroes", joining Queen frontman Freddie Mercury, children's author Roald Dahl, pioneering pilot Amy Johnson, novelist Jane Austen and aviation entrepreneur Freddie Laker. In 2018, Moore was added as an icon to the Ultimate Team in EA Sports' FIFA video game FIFA 19.

The Bobby Moore Academy primary and secondary schools are located in the Queen Elizabeth Olympic Park in Newham near to the London Stadium and were founded in 2017. The Academy has access to facilities at the Park in addition to links to West Ham United, and will have 1,500 student places at full capacity.

Quotes

 "My captain, my leader, my right-hand man. He was the spirit and the heartbeat of the team. A cool, calculating footballer I could trust with my life. He was the supreme professional, the best I ever worked with. Without him England would never have won the World Cup." Alf Ramsey*
 "He was my friend as well as the greatest defender I ever played against. The world has lost one of its greatest football players and an honourable gentleman." Pelé
 "Bobby Moore was a real gentleman and a true friend." Franz Beckenbauer
 "Moore was the best defender I have ever seen." Sir Alex Ferguson
 "Bobby Moore was the best defender in the history of the game" Franz Beckenbauer
"There should be a law against him. He knows what's happening 20 minutes before everyone else." Jock Stein
"Ask me to talk about Bobby Moore the footballer and I will talk for days. Ask me about the man and I will dry up in a minute." Ron Greenwood
"Immaculate footballer. Imperial defender. Immortal hero of 1966. First Englishman to raise the World Cup aloft. Favourite son of London's East End. Finest legend of West Ham United. National Treasure. Master of Wembley. Lord of the game. Captain extraordinary. Gentleman of all time." Inscription on the pedestal of the statue at Wembley Stadium.

Career statistics

Club

International

Scores and results list England's goal tally first, score column indicates score after each Moore goal.

Honours

Player 
West Ham United
FA Cup: 1963–64
FA Charity Shield: 1964
 European Cup Winners' Cup: 1964–65

Eastern AA
Hong Kong Senior Shield: 1981–82

England
 FIFA World Cup: 1966
 UEFA Euro third place: 1968
 British Home Championship:  
 Winners: 1964–65, 1965–66, 1967–68, 1968–69, 1970–71, 1972–73
 Shared: 1963–64, 1969–70, 1971–72

Individual
 Ballon d'Or runner-up: 1970
 FWA Footballer of the Year: 1964
 West Ham Player of the Year: 1961, 1963, 1968, 1970
 FIFA World Cup All-Star Team: 1966
 BBC Sports Personality of the Year: 1966
 Officer of the Order of the British Empire: 1967
 UEFA Euro Team of the Tournament: 1968
 World Soccer World XI: 1968, 1969
 Inducted into the English Football Hall of Fame: 2002
 UEFA Jubilee Awards – Greatest English Footballer of the last 50 Years (Golden Player): 2003
 FIFA World Cup All-Time Team: 1994
 FIFA Order of Merit: 1996
 World Team of the 20th Century: 1998
 Number 6 retired by West Ham: 2008 (posthumous)
 PFA Player of the Century: 2007
 PFA Team of the Century (1907 to 2007):
 Team of the Century 1907–1976
 Overall Team of the Century
 World Soccer Greatest XI of All Time: 2013
 100 Greatest Britons: 2002
 Football League 100 Legends
 IFFHS All-time Men's B Dream Team: 2021

In film and television 
Moore appeared in the 1981 film Escape to Victory, as Terry Brady, and in cameo roles, as himself, in several episodes of Till Death Do Us Part, including one of its spin-off films The Alf Garnett Saga.

Tina and Bobby, a television drama series about Tina and Bobby Moore's relationship, was broadcast on ITV in January 2017, and repeated in August 2020 and June 2021. The part of Bobby Moore is played by Lorne MacFadyen.

Personal life
Moore met his first wife, Tina, in 1957. They married on 30 June 1962. They lived in a house in Chigwell, Essex, that they called "Morlands". They had a daughter, Roberta, and a son, Dean.

They separated in 1984, and divorced in 1986. A relationship developed with Stephanie Parlane (eight years his junior)—they married on 4 December 1991 but Moore died on 24 February 1993,  months later.

His son, Dean, died, aged 43, in his flat on 28 July 2011, attributed to a medical condition and natural causes.

Moore publicly supported Margaret Thatcher at the 1979 general election.

See also

List of footballers with 100 or more caps

References

External links

 Hall of Fame Profile at the National Football Museum
 Bobby Moore Online 
 The Bobby Moore Fund for Cancer Research UK Official Site
 Bobby Moore: Captain, Leader, Legend.
 

!colspan="3" style="background:#C1D8FF;"| World Cup winners' biographical stand-out facts
|-

 
1941 births
1993 deaths
Footballers from Barking, London
English footballers
Association football central defenders
West Ham United F.C. players
Fulham F.C. players
San Antonio Thunder players
Seattle Sounders (1974–1983) players
Carolina Lightnin' players
English Football League players
English Football League representative players
North American Soccer League (1968–1984) players
Outfield association footballers who played in goal
England under-23 international footballers
England international footballers
1962 FIFA World Cup players
1966 FIFA World Cup players
UEFA Euro 1968 players
1970 FIFA World Cup players
FIFA World Cup-winning players
FIFA World Cup-winning captains
FIFA Century Club
UEFA Golden Players
BBC Sports Personality of the Year winners
English Football Hall of Fame inductees
English expatriate footballers
English expatriate sportspeople in the United States
English expatriate sportspeople in Denmark
Expatriate soccer players in the United States
Expatriate men's footballers in Denmark
English football managers
Eastern Sports Club football managers
Oxford City F.C. managers
Southend United F.C. managers
English Football League managers
English expatriate football managers
English expatriate sportspeople in Hong Kong
Expatriate football managers in Hong Kong
English association football commentators
Officers of the Order of the British Empire
Deaths from cancer in England
Deaths from colorectal cancer
Burials at Putney Vale Cemetery
FA Cup Final players
English expatriate sportspeople in Australia
Expatriate soccer players in Australia
Inglewood United FC players